Ishita Dutta Sheth (born 26 August 1990) is an Indian actress and model. She is most notable for her performance in the 2015 Hindi film Drishyam and its 2022 sequel, Drishyam 2. She has also played the lead role in the TV shows Ek Ghar Banaunga, Bepanah Pyaar and Thoda sa Baadal Thoda sa Paani.

Early life
Dutta was raised in Jamshedpur, Jharkhand in a Bengali Hindu family. She attended D.B.M.S. English School in Jamshedpur, and studied Media Studies in Mumbai. Her sister, Tanushree Dutta, is also a model/actress and won the Femina Miss India title (2004).

Personal life
She married her boyfriend and co-star Vatsal Sheth on 28 November 2017 in Mumbai.

Filmography

Films

Television

Music videos

References

External links

 

1990 births
21st-century Indian actresses
Actresses in Hindi cinema
Actresses in Hindi television
Actresses in Kannada cinema
Actresses in Telugu cinema
Bengali actresses
Female models from Jharkhand
Indian film actresses
Indian soap opera actresses
Indian television actresses
Living people
People from Jamshedpur
Actresses from Jharkhand